United Nations Security Council resolution 786, adopted unanimously on 10 November 1992, after reaffirming Resolution 781 (1992), the Council approved a recommendation by the Secretary-General Boutros Boutros-Ghali to increase the strength of the United Nations Protection Force (UNPROFOR) in Bosnia and Herzegovina by 75 observers to monitor the ban on military flights over the country.

The resolution reaffirmed the no-fly zone relating to military flights over Bosnia and Herzegovina and welcomed the advance deployment of observers from UNPROFOR and the European Community Monitoring Mission at airfields in Bosnia and Herzegovina, Croatia and the Federal Republic of Yugoslavia (Serbia and Montenegro). It called on all parties concerned and governments to co-operate with the United Nations Force, asking them to direct all requests for authorisations of all flights relating to UNPROFOR and humanitarian assistance to the Protection Force.

The council also reiterated its determination to consider all violations of the no-fly zone, noting it would consider further measures if necessary.

See also
 Breakup of Yugoslavia
 Bosnian War
 List of United Nations Security Council Resolutions 701 to 800 (1991–1993)
 Yugoslav Wars

References

External links
 
Text of the Resolution at undocs.org

 0786
 0786
Bosnian War
1992 in Bosnia and Herzegovina
1992 in Croatia
1992 in Yugoslavia
 0786
November 1992 events